Tolstaya Dubrova is a rural locality (a selo) and the administrative center of Dubrovsky Selsoviet, Aleysky District, Altai Krai, Russia. The population was 448 as of 2013. There are 7 streets.

Geography 
Tolstaya Dubrova is located on the Beloborodskoye Lake, 46 km southeast of Aleysk (the district's administrative centre) by road. Oskolkovo is the nearest rural locality.

References 

Rural localities in Aleysky District